Danny Murphy (born 8 February 1960) is  a former Australian rules footballer who played with North Melbourne in the Victorian Football League (VFL).

Notes

External links 
		

Living people
1960 births
Australian rules footballers from Victoria (Australia)
North Melbourne Football Club players
Wodonga Football Club players